Private Deedra Irwin (born 27 May 1992 in Pulaski, Wisconsin) is an American biathlete. She competed at the 2022 Winter Olympics in women's mass start, women's relay, women's pursuit, women's individual, and women's sprint.

She graduated from the Michigan Technological University. She is a specialist in the Vermont Army National Guard.

She competed at the Biathlon World Championships 2021 in the team relay.

References

External links
 

1992 births
Living people
American female biathletes
American military Olympians
Biathletes at the 2022 Winter Olympics
Olympic biathletes of the  United States
People from Brown County, Wisconsin
People from Oconto County, Wisconsin
People from Shawano County, Wisconsin
Michigan Technological University alumni
United States Army soldiers
Vermont National Guard personnel